Elaea can refer to any of several different items in ancient geography.

Cities and towns
 Elaea (Aeolis), port of Pergamum, now near Zeytindağ, İzmir Province, Turkey
 Elaea (Aethiopia), port in ancient Aethiopia
 Elaea (Bithynia), port in ancient Bithynia
 Elaea (Epirus), chief city of Elaeatis in Epirus at the mouth of the Acheron
 Elaea (Lebanon), southeast of Sidon, Lebanon

Promontories
 Elaea (promontory of Crete), near Palaikastro, in northeastern Crete, Greece
 Elaea (promontory of Cyprus), in Cyprus

Other
 Elaea (river), in Boeotia, Greece
 Elaea (mythology), a figure in Greek mythology
 Elaea (mantis), an insect genus in the subfamily Gonypetinae
 Elaea (island), one of the Demonisi group, in Bithynia, now in Turkey